is a Japanese term for any kind of Japanese school of traditional arts. The term literally translates as "old school" (ko—old, ryū—school) or "traditional school". It is sometimes also translated as "old style".

Martial Arts
In English, the International Hoplology Society draws a distinction between Koryū and Kobudō martial arts based on their origin and the differences between their ranking of priorities concerning combat, morals, discipline, and/or aesthetic form.

Ikebana (Flower-Arranging)
Ko-ryū is one of the oldest and most traditional schools of Ikebana.

Sources
 Draeger, Donn F. Classical Bujitsu (Martial Arts and Ways of Japan). Weatherhill, 1973, 2007.  
 Hall, David A. Encyclopedia of Japanese Martial Arts. Kodansha USA, 2012. 
 Skoss, Diane, Editor. Koryu Bujutsu: Classical Warrior Traditions of Japan. Koryubooks, 1997. 
 Skoss, Diane, Editor. Sword and Spirit: Classical Warrior Traditions of Japan, Volume 2. Koryubooks, 1999. 
 Skoss, Diane, Editor. Keiko Shokon: Classical Warrior Traditions of Japan, Volume 3. Koryubooks, 2002.

References

Japanese martial arts
Japanese martial arts terminology
Kadō schools